The Hendrick Hopper Homestead is a historic building located in Glen Rock, Bergen County, New Jersey, United States, and was built in the early 19th century. It was home to the Hopper Family and is located on the corner of Ackerman Avenue and Hillman Avenue. The site was added to the National Register of Historic Places in 1983. This house is occupied by a family.

A blue sign stands in front of the house that reads:
Hopper Homestead

North wing built 1780 by Hendrick Hopper in area then called “small lots.” Center section erected by son, John, in early 1800s. The farmhouse was sold to the Hillmann family in 1895 ending four generations and 115 years of continuous Hopper ownership.

The Hopper Family burying ground is also located behind the Hopper Homestead where the farms of Garrett E. Hopper and Hendrick H. Hopper met. Descendants of Hendrick Jan Hopper are buried in the cemetery.

See also 
 National Register of Historic Places listings in Bergen County, New Jersey

References

Houses on the National Register of Historic Places in New Jersey
National Register of Historic Places in Bergen County, New Jersey
Houses in Bergen County, New Jersey
New Jersey Register of Historic Places
Glen Rock, New Jersey